The Sultanate of Siak Sri Indrapura, often called Sultanate of Siak, was a kingdom that was located in the Siak Regency, Riau from 1722 to 1949 CE. It was founded by Raja Kechil, who was from the Johor Kingdom (Sultan Abdul Jalil Rahmad Syah I), after he failed to seize the throne of the Sultanate of Johor. The polity expanded in the 18th century to encompass much of eastern Sumatra as it brought various communities under its control through warfare and control of trade between the interior of Sumatra and the Melaka Straits. The Dutch colonial state signed a series of treaties with Siak rulers in the 19th century, which reduced the area of state influence to the Siak River. For the remainder of the Dutch colonial era, it operated as an independent state with Dutch advisors. After Indonesia's Independence was proclaimed on 17 August 1945, the last sultan of Siak (Sultan Syarif Kasim II) declared his kingdom to join the Republic of Indonesia.

History

The history of Riau before Indonesian independence time has been rooted  in the history of Siak Sri Indrapura, a Malay Islamic kingdom. The Siak-centred sultanate was founded by Sultan Abdul Jalil Rahmad Shah in 1722. The first Sultan died in 1746 and later posthumously given the title of Marhum Buantan. The reign was continued to Sultan Abdul Jalil Muzaffar Shah (1746–1761) who ruled for about 19 years. This second Sultan succeeded in making the Kingdom of Siak Sri Indrapura strong and triumphant.

The third Sultan was Abdul Jalil Jalaluddin Shah (1765–1766)  had only ruled for a year. His real name was Tengku Ismail. His reign was under attacks of the Dutch East India Company (VOC) which took advantage of Tengku Alam (later became the fourth Sultan) as a shield. Sultan Abdul Jalil later dubbed Marhum Mangkat di Balai. Tengku Alam (1766–1780) ascended to the throne after the death of Abdul Jalil Jalaluddin, with the title of Sultan Abdul Jalil Alamuddin Syah and posthumously given the title of Marhum Bukit.

The daughter of fourth Sultan, Abdul Jalil Alamuddin Syah, Badriyyah was married to a person knowledgeable in Islam Sayyid Uthman bin Abdurrahman bin Sa'id bin Ali bin Muhammad bin Hasan bin Umar Banahsan, a Hadhrami of Ba 'Alawi sada family. Uthman was then appointed as a military commander and religious advisor in the Sultanate. Six of their descendants from this marriage became Sultans, which was started since the seventh Sultan of Siak Sri Indrapura (hence their names prefixed with word Syarif or Sayyid).

The book of pedigree Shamsu al-Dzahirah, which is the book of the Ba 'Alawi sada genealogy authored by Sayyid Abdurahman bin Mohammed Al-Mashoor (mufti of Tarim), and several other books such as Shajarah al-Zakiyah written by Yusuf bin Abdullah Jamalullail and al-Mu'jam al-Latif li Asbab al-Alqab wa al-Kunya fi al-Nasab al-Sharif by Sayyid Muhammad bin Ahmad al-Shatri, discuss the family history of Siak Sultanate which many people mistakenly think as of the Shahab families. This has also been verified by the institution for that purpose, al-Rabithah al-Alawiyah. The last name Shahabuddin given to Usman bin Abdurrahman who was married to the daughter of the Sultan of Siak is actually just a title, as well  as titles given to his grandchildren such as Syaifuddin, Khaliluddin, or Jalaluddin. Nevertheless, many descendants of Sayyid Usman bin Abdurrahman in Malaysia still use the Shahab title.

The fifth in throne was Sultan Muhammad Ali Abdul Jalil Muazzam Shah (1780–1782). During his reign the Sultanate of Siak relocated to Senapelan (now Pekanbaru). He is also the founder of the city of Pekanbaru, so since his death in 1782 he was titled with title Marhum Pekan. Sultan Yahya Abdul Jalil Muzaffar Shah later took the position as the sixth sultan during 1782–1784. Like the previous sultan, Sultan Yahya also only had 2 years to rule. He died in 1784 and was posthumously granted the title Marhum Mangkat di Dungun.

The seventh Sultan, Ali Abdul Jalil Syaifuddin Ba'alawi, was the first sultan of Arab descent and holds the title al-Sayyid Sharif. During his reign the Kingdom of Siak reached its peak. He died in 1810 and was posthumously granted the title Marhum Kota Tinggi.

Ibrahim Abdul Jalil Khaliluddin was the eight sultan in the kingdom in 1810–1815, where his real name was Ibrahim. He died in 1815 and then was named the Marhum Mempura Kecil. He was then followed by Sultan Syarif Ismail Abdul Jalil Jalaluddin Ismail who took the reign during 1815–1854 which was given title Marhum Indrapura.  He was then followed by the next sultan, Qasim Abdul Jalil Syaifuddin I (Sharif Qasim I, ruled in 1864 to 1889). He died in 1889 and was posthumously granted the title Marhum Mahkota.  His son, Syarif Hashim Abdul Jalil Muzaffar Shah was then raised to the throne during period 1889–1908. During his rule, many buildings were constructed which now have become the evidence of the Kingdom of Siak. He died in 1908 and was posthumously granted the title Marhum Baginda.

Post Anglo-Dutch Treaties of 1870–71, the colonial government created the Siak Residency in 1873, which covers the entire northeast coast of Sumatra to the sultanate of Deli. The transfer of the capital of the Oostkust van Sumatra residentie (Residency of East Coast Sumatra) in 1887 from Siak to Medan, the capital of Deli, confirms the loss of importance of the sultanate to the Dutch.

The last Sultan of Siak was Syarif Qasim Abdul Jalil Syaifuddin (Syarif Qasim II, who was in throne in 1915–1949). The sultan with real name Tengku Sulong went to the throne seven years after the death of his father Sultan Hashim. In November 1945, Sultan Syarif Qasim II sent a cable to President of the Republic of Indonesia declaring allegiance to the newly created Government of the Republic of Indonesia. Not only that, the Sultan also handed over his property for the struggle of independence of the Republic of Indonesia.

The Palace

The palace is now a museum.

Before its construction, the sultan made a tour of Europe, visiting the Netherlands and Germany. In the architecture of the palace there are European influences that blend harmoniously with the Malay and Moorish elements, with the furniture was even brought from Europe.

The palace contains royal ceremonial objects, such as a gold-plated crown set with diamonds, a golden throne and personal objects of Sultan Syarif Qasyim and his wife, such as the "Komet", a multi-centennial musical instrument which is said to have been made only two copies in the world. Komet still works, and is used to play works by composers such as Beethoven, Mozart and Strauss.

The foundation of the palace of Siak has its share of myth. It is said that while the Sultan and his dignitaries were discussing the project, suddenly appeared a white dragon on the surface of the river Siak. The presence of the dragon was interpreted as a sign of blessing of the project and auspicious for the greatness of the kingdom. To immortalize the dragon, the Sultan made it the official emblem of the kingdom. The pillars of the palace were decorated with ornaments in the form of dragons.

In addition to the palace, the sultan also built a courtroom, the "Balairung Sari" (the flower room).

To the right of the main gate of the Syahabuddin mosque is the royal family cemetery, with its decoration of Muslim art.

List of Sultans of Siak 

 Sultan Abdul Jalil Rahmat Shah (1722–1740)
 Sultan Muhammad Abdul Jalil Jalaluddin Shah (1740–1760)
 Sultan Ismail Abdul Jalil Jalaluddin Shah (1760–1761)(1779–1781)
 Sultan Abdul Jalil Alamuddin Shah (1761–1765)
 Sultan Muhammad Ali Abdul Jalil Muazzam Shah (1765–1779)
 Sultan Yahya Abdul Jalil Muzaffar Shah (1781–1784)
 Sultan As-Sayyid Al-Sharif Ali Abdul Jalil Syaifuddin (1784–1811)
 Sultan As-Sayyid Al-Sharif Ibrahim Abdul Jalil Khaliluddin (1811–1827)
 Sultan As-Sayyid Al-Sharif Ismail Abdul Jalil Syaifuddin (1827–1864)
 Sultan As-Sayyid Al-Sharif Kassim Abdul Jalil Syaifuddin I (Syarif Kassim I), (1864–1889)
 Sultan As-Sayyid Al-Sharif Hasyim Abdul Jalil Syaifuddin (1889–1908)
 Sultan-Regent Siak, Tengku Besar Syed Sagoff (Wali Sultan) (1908-1915)
 Sultan As-Sayyid Al-Sharif Kassim Abdul Jalil Syaifuddin II (Syarif Kassim II), (1915–1949)

Family Tree

See also 
 Pagaruyung Kingdom
 Johor Sultanate
 Riau-Lingga Sultanate
 Sultanate of Deli
 Sultanate of Serdang

Notes

References
 Barnard, TP, (2003). Multiple Centres of Authority: Society and Environment in Siak and Eastern Sumatra, 1674-1827.
Ricklefs, M. C., A History of Modern Indonesia Since C. 1300

External links 
  Sejarah Singkat Kerajaan Siak in Indonesia
  Kronik mengenai pusat Kesultanan Siak in Indonesian language
  Sejarah Kerajaan Siak di MelayuOnline.com in Indonesian language
  Kesultanan Siak di University of Queensland in Indonesian language

Former countries in Southeast Asia
Former countries in Indonesian history
Siak Sri Indrapura
Former monarchies of Southeast Asia